The Pumpkin Karver is a 2006 American slasher film written by Robert Mann and Sheldon Silverstein, produced by Sheldon Silverstein and directed by Robert Mann, it stars Amy Weber, Minka Kelly, Terrence Evans and Charity Shea.

Plot
Jonathan and his sister Lynn have moved to a new town to start a new life after Jonathan killed his sister's boyfriend Alec accidentally in a prank gone horribly wrong. They are heading to a Halloween party but there's a catch: the man Jonathan killed is back in a new, horrific form. Lynn and Jonathan meet some party goers, like Tammy, Spinner and a friend, Tammy's ex, Lance, the sexy-blonde Rachel, Lance's friend, Brian, best friends Yolanda & Vicki and the old carver, Ben Wicket, as well as other party goers. After a fight with Lance, Jonathan starts thinking that Alec is there at the party, but chooses to ignore this.

At night, Rachel has sex in her van with Lance's friend, A.J, but he leaves angrily after Rachel hits him over the face and head. Rachel goes looking for A.J, but when she doesn't find him, goes back to her van. However, she's attacked, by a supposed Alec, who carves her face in.

Later, Brian reveals to Tammy that Lance was "being a dick". Shortly after Tammy leaves, Brian is attacked by a killer, who makes him walk backward, making Brian impale himself.

Jonathan is stalked several times by Ben, but then escapes. Later, Yolanda and Vicki find Rachel and then flee, warning Spinner and a friend, but they are both too drunk and refuse to believe the two girls.

Later, Spinner leaves and his friend is struck with a scythe, before getting decapitated. Jonathan disappears, and Lynn and Tammy go and try to find him. Lynn meets Lance, who attempts to rape her, but she escapes before Lance is later stabbed to death.

Tammy is pursued by the killer, before getting trapped in a bear trap, and right away is stabbed to death. Lynn and Jonathan meet, where they later find Tammy's dead body. Alec and Jonathan meet, and they confront each other, until Jonathan stabs Alec to death, the same way he did in the prank earlier. Later, it is revealed that "Alec" is Lynn's dead boyfriend who has returned for revenge, and it was Jonathan's trauma the one that made him think it was Alec who he had thought had returned for vengeance.

The next morning, the police arrive. Shortly after questioning, Jonathan and Lynn are ready to leave, but Jonathan transforms into Alec, Lynn's dead boyfriend, revealing that he was the killer, and that Ben had been trying to kill him because of that.

The movie ends with Jonathan stabbing Lynn to her death.

Cast

 Amy Weber as Lynn Starks
 Minka Kelly as Tammy
 Terrence Evans as Ben Wicket
 Tony Little as Officer Briggs
 Charity Shea as Rachel
 Michael Zara as Jonathan Starks
 Mistie Adams as Yolanda
 David Austin as Lance
 Lindsey Carpenter as Amber
 Rachelle Clune as Connie
 Jonathan Conrad as A.J.
 Amy Cowieson as Go-Go Dancer
 Briana Gerber as Vicki
 Kenny Gould as Detective Farrows
 Thomas Hurn as Joe
 Bryan Jamerson as MIB Kid #2
 Brian Kary as MIB Kid #1
 Amber Kendrella as Marilyn Monroe
 Robert Mann as D.J. Jon on Radio
 David Phillips as Bonedaddy
 Jared Show as Grazer
 Alex Weed as Spinner
 David J. Wright as Alec

Release
The film was released on 31 October 2006 as direct-to-video project over First Look International.

References

External links
 
 

2006 films
American comedy horror films
American independent films
Films shot in California
Australian slasher films
2006 comedy horror films
2000s slasher films
Halloween horror films
Films set in California
Australian horror films
Australian independent films
American slasher films
American films about revenge
American ghost films
American exploitation films
2006 comedy films
2006 independent films
American splatter films
2000s English-language films
2000s American films